Vanja Iveša (born 21 July 1977 in Pula) is a retired Croatian football goalkeeper, who last played for NK Opatija.

Club career
Over 2 meters tall, Iveša's career spanned over 26 years of professional football, during which he played for numerous clubs in Croatia, Turkey and Australia. On 17 February 2018, Iveša became the oldest ever player to have played in the Croatian First Football League.

References

External links
 
 
 
 The Tallest Players List at thebesteleven.com

1977 births
Living people
Sportspeople from Pula
Association football goalkeepers
Croatian footballers
NK Istra players
HNK Rijeka players
NK Novalja players
Sydney United 58 FC players
NK Žminj players
NK Slaven Belupo players
Eskişehirspor footballers
Elazığspor footballers
NK Opatija players
NK Istra 1961 players
Croatian Football League players
National Soccer League (Australia) players
Süper Lig players
TFF First League players
First Football League (Croatia) players
Croatian expatriate footballers
Expatriate footballers in Turkey
Croatian expatriate sportspeople in Turkey
Expatriate soccer players in Australia
Croatian expatriate sportspeople in Australia